The Scandinavian and Russian taiga is an ecoregion within the taiga and boreal forests biome as defined by the WWF classification (ecoregion PA0608). In Sweden the taiga is primarily associated with the Norrland terrain.

Description
The Scandinavian and Russian taiga consists of coniferous forests dominated by Pinus sylvestris (in drier locations), often with an understory of Juniperus communis, Picea abies and Picea obovata and a significant admixture of Betula pubescens and Betula pendula. Larix sibirica is characteristic of the eastern part of the ecoregion. Geobotanically, it belongs to the Northeastern European floristic province of the Circumboreal Region of the Holarctic Kingdom.

The sole vertebrate endemic in this ecoregion is the avian species, razorbill (Alca torda). However, there are a number of special status mammals and birds within the Scandinavian and Russian taiga, as well as one reptilian taxon.

Growing season in taiga areas is generally considered to be measured as the number of days for which average daily temperature exceeds . The longest growing season for the Scandinavian and Russian taiga occurs in the locales with marine influence from the North Sea and Baltic Sea: in coastal areas of Norway, Sweden and Finland the growing season of the closed boreal forest can reach as high as 145 to 180 days per annum. The shortest growing season of the ecoregion is found in continental Russia and at the far northern part of the ecoregion at the ecotone with tundra.

Soil nutrient levels are generally poor, but diversity of soil organisms can attain high levels, particularly in the southern reaches of the ecoregion. In these southern elements of the ecoregion, closed canopy boreal forest with some temperate deciduous tree species interspersed among the dominant conifers, including maple, elm and oak. In some areas of Norway, Sweden, Finland and western Russia, this zone is exploited for agriculture. Some of the elements of the ecoregion are rich in wetlands, as exemplified by the Femundsmarka National Park in Norway, which is replete with marshes and lakes.

Biodiversity

There are a total of 368 native vertebrate species in the Scandinavian and Russian taiga according to WWF tabulation; when all migratory bird species are included, this number is somewhat larger.

This ecoregion supports the following native non-endemic threatened mammals:
 European mink (Mustela lutreola, Endangered)
 European otter (Lutra lutra, Near Threatened)
 garden dormouse (Eliomys quercinus, Near Threatened)
 Greater noctule bat (Nyctalus lasiopterus, Near Threatened)
 pond bat (Myotis dasycneme, Near Threatened)
 western barbastelle (Barbastella barbastellus, Vulnerable)
 Russian desman (Desmana moschata, Vulnerable)

The Scandinavian and Russian taiga has only a single non-endemic special status native reptile: the Lower Risk grass snake (Natrix natrix).

Native non-endemic threatened avian species in the ecoregion are:
 aquatic warbler (Acrocephalus paludicola, Vulnerable)
 black-tailed godwit (Limosa limosa, Near Threatened)
 Eurasian curlew (Numenius arquata, Near Threatened)
 European roller (Coracias garrulus, Near Threatened)
 great snipe (Gallinago media, Near Threatened)
 greater spotted eagle (Aquila clanga, Vulnerable)
 lesser white-fronted goose (Anser erythropus, Vulnerable)
 pallid harrier (Circus macrourus, Near Threatened)
 red-footed falcon (Falco vespertinus, Near Threatened)
 yellow-breasted bunting (Emberiza aureola, Vulnerable)

Protected areas

The following is a partial list of protected areas lying within the Scandinavian and Russian taiga:
 Björnlandet National Park, Sweden
 Femundsmarka National Park, Norway
 Helvetinjärvi National Park, Finland
 Isojärvi National Park, Finland
 Koli National Park, Finland
 Liesjärvi National Park, Finland
 Muddus National Park, Sweden
 Paanajärvi National Park, Russia
 Skuleskogen National Park, Sweden
 Vodlozersky National Park, Russia

References

 
 
 
 
 

Taiga and boreal forests
Ecoregions of Europe
Ecoregions of Finland
Ecoregions of Norway
Ecoregions of Russia
Ecoregions of Sweden
Forests of Finland
Forests and woodlands of Norway
Forests of Sweden
Palearctic ecoregions